Vincent Le Baron (born 10 June 1989) is a French former professional footballer who played as a midfielder. He started his senior career hometown club Vannes OC and with Saint-Colomban Locminé. Le Baron made 13 appearances for Vannes during the 2010–11 season and was signed by Stade Lavallois in the summer of 2011.

References

Vincent Le Baron profile at foot-national.com

Living people
1989 births
Sportspeople from Vannes
French footballers
Footballers from Brittany
Association football midfielders
Brittany international footballers
Ligue 2 players
Vannes OC players
Saint-Colomban Sportive Locminé players
Stade Lavallois players
AS Vitré players
Le Mans FC players